Regency Hospital is a Super speciality tertiary care corporate hospital in Uttar Pradesh, India, established in 1995. The hospital was established in technical consultancy with Indian Hospital Corporation Ltd. (Apollo Hospital). Regency Hospital Ltd was a listed Public Ltd. Company at BSE and UP Stock Exchange Ltd. The hospital has regular OPD, 24 hours emergency service with in-patient admission facilities for more than 200 patients.

In a span of 20 years, the hospital has been able to establish a distinct identity for delivering super specialty medical services to Kanpur, surrounding cities & rural areas. Regency Healthcare's vision is to become the largest Healthcare player in the State of Uttar Pradesh over the next 5 years.

References

Hospital buildings completed in 1995
Hospitals in Kanpur
Hospitals established in 1995
1995 establishments in Uttar Pradesh
20th-century architecture in India